Poland's 69th Senate district is one of 100 Polish Senate districts which elect one member of the Senate using first-past-the-post voting. It is currently represented by Wojciech Konieczny of the Polish Socialist Party.

The district was created in 2011 when the Polish Senate moved from multi-member constituencies to single-member constituencies.

District profile 
The district encompasses the city of Częstochowa.

Members of Senate

Election Results

  | style="background-color: Yellow" |
  | UP-OdS
  | Cezary Graj
  | align="right"|3,862
  | align="right"| 3.8
  | align="right"|-
  |-

  | style="background-color: Red" |
  | ZL
  | Jarosław Marszałek
  | align="right"|13,412
  | align="right"|13.5
  | align="right"|-1.4
  |-
  | style="background-color: Blue" |
  | JOW Bezpartyjni
  | Tomasz Bebłociński
  | align="right"|6,168
  | align="right"| 6.2
  | align="right"|-
 |-

  | style="background-color: Red" |
  | PPS (The Left)
  | Wojciech Konieczny
  | align="right"|49,261
  | align="right"|43.8
  | align="right"|+30.2

| style="background-color: Red" |
  | BS
  | Krzysztof Świerczyński
  | align="right"|19,433
  | align="right"|17.3
  | align="right"|-
  |-

Notes

References

69